Flanby (often misspelled "Flamby") is a French caramel custard (Crème caramel) marketed by Lactalis Nestlé Produits Frais, a joint venture between Nestlé and Lactalis agribusiness, sold in plastic pots.

Former French President François Hollande is pejoratively nicknamed Flanby.

See also
 List of custard desserts

References

Custard desserts